Dion Gary Parson (born June 11, 1967) is an American jazz drummer from the U.S. Virgin Islands.

Parson was born on St. Thomas and played trombone as a child before picking up drums when he was fifteen years old. He studied at Interlochen and then at Rutgers, where he studied under Keith Copeland and took his bachelor's degree in music education in 1990. In the 1990s he was based primarily in New York City, where he worked with Monty Alexander, Ray Anderson, Dwayne Burno, Don Byron, Marc Cary, Laurent de Wilde, Donald Harrison, Ernest Ranglin, Justin Robinson, and David Sanchez. He has also worked extensively with Ron Blake and fellow Virgin Islander Reuben Rogers. He worked with the Broadway production of The Color Purple starting in 2006, and co-founded the organization United Jazz International with Steve Coleman and Branford Marsalis in 2007. He has taught at Rutgers University, Cheyney University, North Carolina University, and Harlem School of the Arts.

Discography

With Steve Turre
Keep Searchin' (HighNote, 2006)

References
Gary W. Kennedy, "Dion Parson". The New Grove Dictionary of Jazz. 2nd edition, ed. Barry Kernfeld.
Leonard Feather and Ira Gitler, The Biographical Encyclopedia of Jazz. Oxford, 1999.

American jazz drummers
United States Virgin Islands musicians